New Canaan is a town in the U.S. state of Connecticut.

New Canaan may also refer to:
New Canaan (CDP), Connecticut, the central village in the town of New Canaan
New Canaan, Nova Scotia, a community in Cumberland County
New Canaan, Ontario, a rural settlement in Essex County
Nova Canaã, Bahia, a municipality in Brazil
New Canaan, an area in or near Harare, Zimbabwe
New Canaan, a song by Bill Wurtz